Edward John Dunphy (May 12, 1856 – July 29, 1926) of New York City was a member of the United States House of Representatives from New York from 1889 to 1895. He was a Democrat.

Biography
Edward J. Dunphy was born in New York City on May 12, 1856.  He attended the public schools and St. Francis Xavier College, and graduated from Mount St. Mary's College with a Bachelor of Arts degree in 1876 and a Master of Arts in 1878.

He studied law, was admitted to the bar in 1878 and commenced practice in New York City.  Dunphy was later employed in the legal department of the New York Central Railroad.

Tenure in Congress 
Dunphy was elected as a Democrat to the Fifty-first, Fifty-second, and Fifty-third Congresses (March 4, 1889 – March 3, 1895).  In his final term, he was chairman of the Committee on Expenditures in the Department of Justice.  He was not a candidate for reelection in 1894 and resumed the practice of law in New York City.

Later career and death 
In 1891 Dunphy received the honorary degree of LL.D. from Mount St. Mary's.

He died in New York City on July 29, 1926.  He was interred at Calvary Cemetery.

External links

1856 births
1926 deaths
Politicians from New York City
Mount St. Mary's University alumni
New York (state) lawyers
Democratic Party members of the United States House of Representatives from New York (state)
Burials at Calvary Cemetery (Queens)
19th-century American lawyers